Tiny Toon Adventures: Cartoon Workshop is an educational entertainment video game for the Nintendo Entertainment System based on Tiny Toon Adventures. It was developed by Novotrade and released by Konami on August 17, 1992.

Gameplay

The game allows the player to make a cartoon by writing the scenario, selecting music and sound, designing the set, and directing the actions taken by the in-game characters.

Up to two characters can be featured on screen at once, with Buster, Babs, Plucky, Furrball, Calamity, and Little Beeper available for selection. The characters can be set in many different poses and situations, and the cartoons have a myriad of settings and backgrounds for the show to take place. There are also options for musical inserts, sound effects, captions, and editing features using an easy-to-use graphic user interface that resembles a watered-down version of most Windows 3.1 applications.

Saving the cartoon is not possible, however, unless one uses a VCR or other screen capture method. Cartoons created on this video game can only last up to five minutes, as opposed to the typical 28 minutes of an episode of the TV show Tiny Toon Adventures.

See also
Acme Animation Factory

References

External links

1992 video games
Filmmaking video games
Konami games
Nintendo Entertainment System games
Nintendo Entertainment System-only games
North America-exclusive video games
Video games based on Tiny Toon Adventures
Video games developed in Hungary
Single-player video games